The Moxon antenna or Moxon Rectangle is a simple and mechanically robust two-element parasitic array, single-frequency antenna. It takes its name from the amateur radio operator and antenna handbook author Les Moxon (call sign G6XN).

Design

The Moxon antenna design is rectangular, with slightly less than half of the rectangle being the driven element (radiator) and the other part (slightly more than half) being the reflector. It is a two element Yagi-Uda antenna with folded dipole elements, and with no director(s).

Because of the folded ends, the element lengths are approximately 70% of the equivalent dipole length. The two element design gives modest directivity (about 2.0 dB) with a null towards the rear of the antenna, yielding a high front-to-back ratio: Gain up to 9.7 dBi can be achieved at 28 MHz. Because the placement and size of the parasitic reflector both depend highly on wavelength, each Moxon antenna functions properly on only one frequency.

Portable Moxon rectangles are favored by radio amateurs for field day and for emergency communications use, because of their lightweight and robust construction.

Practical construction
The Moxon antenna is popular with amateur radio enthusiasts for its simplicity of construction. The drawing shows the system of construction. The driven element is at the left, and the parasitic on the right, mechanically connected with an insulator (blue in the drawing). The antenna is in layout similar to the well known VK2ABQ-Square. For use on shortwave-bands spreaders are commonly made of bamboo or glass-fiber reinforced plastics, carrying a radiator and reflector made from wire. Such antennas can be built with little wind load and minimal weight.

L.B. Cebik (W4RNL) made detailed comparisons and calculations of several different versions of Moxon antennas. AC6LA provides a calculator which is based on empirical formulas developed by Cebik.

References

Sources

External links

Notes 

Radio frequency antenna types
Antennas (radio)